The Art Directors Guild Award for Excellence in Production Design for a Fantasy Film is one of the annual awards given by the Art Directors Guild starting from 2000.

This award was combined with Excellence in Production Design for a Period Film from 2000 to 2005, and is now in its own category from 2006.

Winners and nominees
Movies marked with a dagger (†) won the Academy Award for Best Production Design. Movies marked with a double dagger (‡) were Academy Award nominees.

2000–2005 (Fantasy or Period)

2006–2009 (Fantasy)

2010s

2020s

References

Art Directors Guild Awards
2000s in American cinema
2010s in American cinema